Headspace Guide to Meditation is a 2021 animated docuseries created for Netflix in collaboration with Headspace. The series details the benefits of guided meditation and offers viewers techniques to help get started. It premiered on January 1, 2021.

References

External links 

Netflix original documentary television series
English-language Netflix original programming
2020s American animated television series
2020s American documentary television series